Dmitri Kurakin (born 5 June 1975 in Tallinn) is an Estonian former ice dancer who also competed internationally for Germany. He originally competed with Anna Mosenkova for Estonia. They were multiple medalists at the Estonian Figure Skating Championships and competed at the World Figure Skating Championships, the European Figure Skating Championships, and the World Junior Figure Skating Championships. He teamed up with Jill Vernekohl in 2001 and they are the 2001 and 2002 German silver medalists.

Kurakin is the older brother of Juri Kurakin, who is also an ice dancer.

References

External links
 Tracings.net profile

Estonian male ice dancers
German male ice dancers
1975 births
Living people
Figure skaters from Tallinn
Estonian people of Russian descent